Rita Kothari (born 30 July 1969) is a Gujarati and English language author and translator from Gujarat, India. In an attempt to preserve her memories and her identity as a member of the Sindhi people, Kothari wrote several books on partition and its effects on people. She has translated several  Gujarati works into English.

Life 
Kothari completed a Bachelor of Arts degree in 1989 at St. Xavier's College, Ahmedabad, followed two years later by a Master of Arts degree in English literature at the University of Pune. She was awarded a Master of Philosophy degree in 1995 and a Doctor of Philosophy degree in 2000 from Gujarat University for her research work in The Experience of Translating Hindi Prose and Translating India : The Cultural Politics of English, respectively.

Kothari teaches in the English department at Ashoka University, Sonipat. She worked from 2007 to 2017 with the Humanities and Social Sciences Department at the Indian Institute of Technology Gandhinagar. She taught Indian literature in English and translation at St. Xavier's College, Ahmedabad from 1992 to 2007. Following that she joined MICA (Institute of Strategic Marketing and Communication) as a professor in culture and communication.

Kothari's teaching interests include literature, cinema, ethnography, and cultural history. Movement across languages, contexts, and cultures form the fulcrum of her interests, making translation the prism through which she sees the Indian context.

She lives in Ahmedabad.

Works 
In an attempt to preserve memories and her identity as Sindhi, Kothari wrote Translating India: The Cultural Politics of English (2003), The Burden of Refuge: The Sindhi Hindus of Gujarat (2007), Unbordered Memories : Partition Stories from Sindh (2009), and Memories and Movements (2016).

Kothari co-translated Modern Gujarati Poetry and Coral Island: The Poetry of Niranjan Bhagat. She translated Joseph Macwan's Gujarati novel Angaliayat as The Stepchild and Ila Mehta's Vaad as Fence (2015) into English. She co-edited Decentring Translation Studies : India and Beyond (2009) with Judy Wakabayashi and Chutnefying English : The Phenomenon of Hinglish (2011) with Rupert Snell. She is the editor and translator of Speech and Silence : Literary Journeys by Gujarati Women. She co-translated with her husband, Abhijit Kothari, K. M. Munshi's Patan trilogy: Patan Ni Prabhuta as The Glory of Patan (2017), Gujarat No Nath as The Lord and Master of Gujarat (2018) and Rajadhiraj as King of Kings (2019).

Selected publications

References

External links 
 
 

1969 births
Living people
Gujarati-language writers
People from Ahmedabad district
20th-century Indian translators
English-language writers from India
Indian women translators
Women writers from Gujarat
Indian memoirists
Indian women academics
20th-century women writers
Women memoirists
Sindhi female writers
Gujarati–English translators
20th-century Indian women